Michael Francis Eng (born September 14, 1946) is an American politician serving as one of five members of the California Unemployment Insurance Appeals Board (CUIAB) since 2019. A member of the Democratic Party, he was appointed to the body, an administrative court system for workers and employers, ruling on work-related benefits, by State Assembly Speaker Anthony Rendon. Eng previously served in the Monterey Park City Council (2003–2006) and California State Assembly (2006–2012); he was Mayor of Monterey Park from 2004 to 2005. He was elected to the Los Angeles Community College District Board of Trustees in 2013 and served until 2017.

Biography
In 2004, Eng became Mayor of Monterey Park, California, an office he held until 2005.

Eng has served as a City Councilman, State Assemblyman and Community College Board Vice President. He has also served as Vice Chair of the State Board of Acupuncture and President of the Monterey Park Library Board of Trustees. While in the Assembly, he chaired the Committee on Transportation, Committee on Business and Professions and Committee on Banking and Finance.

In 2018, he ran for the California State Senate, but was defeated in November by Baldwin Park City Councilwoman Susan Rubio.

He founded a downtown immigration law firm and has also been on the teaching faculty at California State University, Los Angeles, UCLA, Los Angeles Trade Tech College and University of the West.

References

External links 
 Eng & Nishimura Law Firm
 Join California Mike Eng

1946 births
Living people
American mayors of Chinese descent
California politicians of Chinese descent
California city council members
California Democrats
Lawyers from Oakland, California
Mayors of places in California
People from Monterey Park, California
Politicians from Oakland, California
Politicians from Los Angeles
Spouses of California politicians
UCLA School of Law alumni
University of Hawaiʻi alumni
21st-century American politicians